Brent Cross is a London Underground station located on Highfield Avenue in the Golders Green area of north west London. The station is a Grade II listed building.

The station is on the Edgware branch of the Northern line, between Hendon Central and Golders Green stations, and in Travelcard Zone 3. The Brent Cross shopping centre is equidistant between this station and Hendon Central station.

History
The station was designed by architect Stanley Heaps and opened as Brent, the name of the nearby river, on 19 November 1923. It was the first station of the extension of what was then known as the Hampstead & Highgate Line, which was built through undeveloped rural areas to Edgware.

The extension had first been planned prior to the First World War when the station had been due to be called "Woodstock". It was renamed from Brent to its current name on the 2 March 1976 opening of the shopping centre.

Two passing loops were built at the station, not long after it opened, to allow fast trains to overtake slower ones here, but these extra tracks were removed in the 1930s. The bridges over Highfield Avenue reflect this extra width, although both north and south of the station the alignment narrows again.

Development 
A planning application, registered in March 2008, for the nearby Brent Cross area would improve bus services passing the station. A turning circle for buses outside the tube station is proposed, needing the demolition of nearby housing.

In early 2008, the London Group of the Campaign for Better Transport published the North and West London Light Railway Proposal (q.v.) for a rapid transit scheme through the Brent Cross site, terminating at the tube station.

Connections
London Buses routes 112, 210 and 232 serve the station.

References

Gallery

External links

 A History of London Tube Maps – 1914 map showing proposed station name as Woodstock
 London Transport Museum Photographic Archive
 
 
 

Northern line stations
Tube stations in the London Borough of Barnet
Former London Electric Railway stations
Railway stations in Great Britain opened in 1923
London Underground Night Tube stations
Stanley Heaps railway stations
1923 establishments in England